The 2014 UCI Europe Tour was the tenth season of the UCI Europe Tour. The 2014 season began on 2 February 2014 with the Grand Prix Cycliste la Marseillaise and ended on 19 October 2014 with the Chrono des Nations.

The points leader, based on the cumulative results of previous races, wears the UCI Europe Tour cycling jersey. Riccardo Zoidl of Austria was the defending champion of the 2013 UCI Europe Tour. The 2014 Europe Tour was won by Tom Van Asbroeck.

Throughout the season, points are awarded to the top finishers of stages within stage races and the final general classification standings of each of the stages races and one-day events. The quality and complexity of a race also determines how many points are awarded to the top finishers, the higher the UCI rating of a race, the more points are awarded.

The UCI ratings from highest to lowest are as follows:
 Multi-day events: 2.HC, 2.1 and 2.2
 One-day events: 1.HC, 1.1 and 1.2

Events

February

March

April

May

June

July

August

September

October

Final standings
There was a competition for the rider, team and country with the most points gained from winning or achieving a high place in the above races.

Individual classification

Teams classification

Nations classification

Nations under-23 classification

References

External links
 

 
UCI Europe Tour
2014 UCI Europe Tour
UCI